Keep on Dancing was a various artists "hits" collection album released in Australia in 1983 on the EMI record Label (Cat No. GIVE 2008). The album spent 3 weeks at the top of the Australian album charts in 1983.

Track listing
Side 1:
Duran Duran - "Is There Something I Should Know?"
Rick Springfield - "Affair of the Heart"
Hot Chocolate - "What Kinda' Boy You're Lookin' For (Girl)"
Eurythmics - "Love Is a Stranger"
Real Life - "Send Me an Angel" (Extended dance mix)
Kajagoogoo - "Oohh To Be Ah"
Sylvester - "Do Ya Wanna Funk"
The Honeymoon - "Love Wakes Up"
Bananarama - "Na Na Hey Hey Kiss Him Goodbye"

Side 2:
Naked Eyes - "(There's) Always Something There to Remind Me"
The Greg Kihn Band - "Jeopardy"
Haysi Fantayzee - "Shiny Shiny"
Flash and the Pan - "Waiting for a Train" (French take)
Toto Coelo - "Dracula's Tango (Sucker for Your Love)"
George Clinton - "Atomic Dog"
The Radiators - "No Tragedy"
Julius Brown - "Party"
Thomas Dolby - "She Blinded Me with Science" (Extended dance mix)

Charts

References

1983 compilation albums